Daly City is the second most populous city in San Mateo County, California, United States, with population of 104,901 according to the 2020 census. Located in the San Francisco Bay Area, and immediately south of San Francisco (sharing its northern border with almost all of San Francisco's southern border), it is named for businessman and landowner John Donald Daly.

History 

Archaeological evidence suggests the San Francisco Bay Area has been inhabited as early as 2700 BC. People of the Ohlone language group probably occupied Northern California from at least the year A.D. 500. Though their territory had been claimed by Spain since the early 16th century, they would have relatively little contact with Europeans until 1769, when, as part of an effort to colonize Alta California, an exploration party led by Don Gaspar de Portolá learned of the existence of San Francisco Bay. Seven years later, in 1776, an expedition led by Juan Bautista de Anza selected the site for the Presidio of San Francisco, which José Joaquín Moraga would soon establish. Later the same year, the Franciscan missionary Francisco Palóu founded the Mission San Francisco de Asís (Mission Dolores). As part of the founding, the priests claimed the land south of the mission for sixteen miles for raising crops and for fodder for cattle and sheep. In 1778, the priests and soldiers marked out a trail to connect San Francisco to the rest of California. At the top of Mission Hill, the priests named the gap between San Bruno Mountain and the hills on the coast La Portezuela ("The Little Door"). La Portezuela was later referred to as Daly's Hill, the Center of Daly City, and is now called Top of the Hill.

During Spanish rule, the area between San Bruno Mountain and the Pacific remained uninhabited. Upon independence from Spain, prominent Mexican citizens were granted land parcels to establish large ranches, three of which covered areas now in Daly City and Colma. Rancho Buri Buri was granted to Jose Sanchez in 1835 and covered  including parts of modern-day Colma, Burlingame, San Bruno, South San Francisco, and Millbrae. Rancho Laguna de la Merced was  acres and covered the area around a lake of the same name. The third ranch covering parts of the Daly City–Colma area was named Rancho Cañada de Guadalupe la Visitación y Rodeo Viejo and stretched from the Visitacion Valley area in San Francisco, to the city of South San Francisco covering .

Following the Mexican Cession of California at the end of the Mexican–American War the owners of Rancho Laguna de La Merced tried to claim land between San Bruno Mountain and Lake Merced. An 1853 US government survey declared that the contested area was in fact government property and could be acquired by private citizens. There was a brief land rush as settlers, mainly Irish established ranches and farms in parts of what is now the neighborhoods of Westlake, Serramonte, and the cities of Colma and Pacifica. A decade later, several families left as increase in the fog density killed grain and potato crops. The few remaining families switched to dairy and cattle farming as a more profitable enterprise. In the late 19th century as San Francisco grew and San Mateo County was established, Daly City also gradually grew including homes and schools along the lines for the Southern Pacific railroad. Daly City served as a location where San Franciscans would cross over county lines to gamble and fight. As tensions built in approach to the American Civil War, California was divided between pro-slavery, and Free Soil advocates. Two of the main figures in the debate were US Senator David C. Broderick, a Free Soil advocate, and David S. Terry, who was in favor of extension of slavery into California. Quarreling and political fighting between the two eventually led to a duel in the Lake Merced area at which Terry mortally wounded Broderick, who would die three days later. The site of the duel is marked with two granite shafts where the men stood, and is designated as California Historical Landmark number 19.

20th century

On the morning of April 18, 1906, a major earthquake struck just off the coast of Daly City near Mussel Rock. After quake and subsequent fire destroyed many San Franciscans homes, they left to temporary housing on the ranches of the area to the south, including the large one owned by John Daly. Daly had come to the Bay Area in 1853 where he had worked on a dairy farm, and after several years married his bosses' daughter and acquired  at the Top of the Hill area. Over the years Daly's business grew, as did his political clout. When a flood of refugees from the quake came, Daly and other local farmers donated milk and other food items. Daly later subdivided his property, from which several housing tracts emerged.

As some of the refugees established homes in the area, the need for city services grew. This, combined with the fear of annexation by San Francisco and being ignored by San Mateo County, whose seat far to the south left residents feeling ignored, created a demand for incorporation. The first such attempt was proposed in 1908 for incorporation as the city of Vista Grande. Vista Grande would have spanned from the Pacific to the Bay, with San Francisco as its northern border and South San Francisco and the old Rancho Buri Buri as its southern border. The proposal was rejected over the scope of the planned city, which was too broad for many residents. The initial proposal also revealed rifts in the community among the various regions, including the area around the cemeteries, who were excluded from further plans of incorporation. On January 16, 1911, an incorporation committee filed a petition with San Mateo County supervisors to incorporate the City of Daly City. The city would run from San Francisco along the San Bruno Hills until Price and School streets with San Francisco and west to the summit of the San Bruno Hills. The city would have an estimated population of 2,900. On March 18, 1911, a special election was held, with incorporation narrowly succeeding by a vote of 132 to 130.

It remained a relatively small community until the late 1940s, when developer Henry Doelger established Westlake, a major district of homes and businesses, including the Westlake Shopping Center. Beginning in the 1950's Filipino Americans began to purchase homes east of  Junipero Serra Boulevard, as they were barred from the Westlake development due to racial covenants. On March 22, 1957, Daly City was again the epicenter of an earthquake, this one a 5.3 magnitude quake on the San Andreas Fault, which caused some structural damage in Westlake and closed State Route 1 along the Westlake Palisades. In 1963, Daly City annexed the city of Bayshore. The Cow Palace, located in Bayshore and now within the city limits of Daly City, was the site of the following year's Republican National Convention. The Daly City BART station opened on September 11, 1972, providing northern San Mateo County with rail service to downtown San Francisco and other parts of the Bay Area. The line was extended south to Colma in 1996 and then to Millbrae and the San Francisco International Airport in 2003.

In October 1984, Taiwanese American writer Henry Liu was assassinated in his garage in Daly City, allegedly by Kuomintang agents.

Geography 

Daly City is bordered by the cities of San Francisco, Brisbane, Pacifica, South San Francisco, and the town of Colma. The city borders several unincorporated areas of San Mateo County. It surrounds Broadmoor, and borders San Bruno Mountain State Park, the Olympic Club, Lake Merced, and unincorporated areas near Colma. Seismic faults in and near Daly City include the San Andreas Fault, Hillside Fault and Serra Fault.

Neighborhoods 

Neighborhoods of Daly City include Westlake, St. Francis Heights, Serramonte, Top of the Hill, Hillside, Crocker, Southern Hills, and Bayshore. Westlake is notable for its distinct architecture and for being among the earliest examples of a planned, large-tract suburb. It was the inspiration for Malvina Reynolds' 1962 song "Little Boxes", and later a coffee-table book and documentary Little Boxes: The Architecture of a Classic Midcentury Suburb. Bayshore, the easternmost neighborhood of Daly City, was once an incorporated city, Bayshore City, until being annexed to Daly City in 1963. Several Daly City neighborhoods, such as Crocker, Southern Hills, and Bayshore, share a street grid and similar characteristics with adjacent San Francisco neighborhoods, such as Crocker-Amazon and Visitacion Valley.

Several neighborhoods associated with Daly City lie outside of its city limits. Broadmoor is an unincorporated area completely surrounded by Daly City. Colma is an incorporated town sandwiched between Daly City, South San Francisco, and San Bruno Mountain. These enclaves are in charge of their own police and fire services, but also share some services with Daly City.

Climate
Daly City's climate is similar to San Francisco's climate, with fog occurring in the spring and early-late summer. Summers are cool and dry, whereas winters are mild and wet.

Demographics

2010 
The 2010 United States Census reported that Daly City had a population of 101,123.

The racial makeup of Daly City was 56,267 (55.6%) Asian, 23,842 (23.6%) White, 3,600 (3.6%) African American, 805 (0.8%) Pacific Islander, 404 (0.4%) Native American, 11,236 (11.1%) from other races, and 4,969 (4.9%) from two or more races.

It is the largest city with a majority Asian population in the contiguous United States.

Among the total population of Daly City, 33.2% were Filipino, 15.4% Chinese, 1.8% Burmese, 1.0% Vietnamese, 0.6% Indian, 0.6% Korean, 0.6% Japanese, 0.2% Indonesian, and 0.2% were Thai. Hispanic or Latino of any race were 23,929 persons (23.7%); 9.4% of Daly City's population is of Mexican origin; 4.9% is of Salvadoran, 2.7% Nicaraguan, 1.3% Guatemalan, 0.7% Peruvian, 0.7% Puerto Rican, and 0.5% Honduran heritage.

The Census reported that 100,442 people (99.3% of the population) lived in households, 273 (0.3%) lived in non-institutionalized group quarters, and 408 (0.4%) were institutionalized.

There were 31,090 households, out of which 11,050 (35.5%) had children under the age of 18 living in them, 15,883 (51.1%) were opposite-sex married couples living together, 4,667 (15.0%) had a female householder with no husband present, 2,238 (7.2%) had a male householder with no wife present.  There were 1,632 (5.2%) unmarried opposite-sex partnerships, and 293 (0.9%) same-sex married couples or partnerships. 5,855 households (18.8%) were made up of individuals, and 2,136 (6.9%) had someone living alone who was 65 years of age or older. The average household size was 3.23.  There were 22,788 families (73.3% of all households); the average family size was 3.63.

The population was spread out, with 19,614 people (19.4%) under the age of 18, 10,506 people (10.4%) aged 18 to 24, 29,663 people (29.3%) aged 25 to 44, 27,717 people (27.4%) aged 45 to 64, and 13,623 people (13.5%) who were 65 years of age or older.  The median age was 38.3 years. For every 100 females, there were 97.5 males.  For every 100 females age 18 and over, there were 95.3 males.

The homeowner vacancy rate was 1.9%; the rental vacancy rate was 4.2%.  58,239 people (57.6% of the population) lived in owner-occupied housing units and 42,203 people (41.7%) lived in rental housing units.

Daly City is home to the only Karaite synagogue in the United States, Congregation B'nai Israel.

As of 2010 census figures, 40.7% of Daly City residents are of Filipino descent, the highest concentration of Filipino/Filipino Americans of any mid-sized city in North America.  This partly explains Daly City's place in the vernacular as the "Pinoy Capital". Benito M. Vergara Jr. goes into the details of this history in his ethnography Pinoy Capital: The Filipino Nation in Daly City.

2000 
As of the census of 2000, there were 101,514 people, 29,843 households, and 21,847 families residing in the city.

There were 29,843 households, out of which 35.1% had children under the age of 18 living with them, 51.5% were married couples living together, 11.2% had a female householder with no husband present, and 28.0% were non-families. Of all households 22.1% were made up of individuals, and 5.7% had someone living alone who was 65 years of age or older.  The average household size was 4.34 and the average family size was 4.78.

In the city, the age distribution of the population shows 25.5% under the age of 18, 11.5% from 18 to 24, 32.2% from 25 to 44, 21.8% from 45 to 64, and 10.0% who were 65 years of age or older.  The median age was 32 years. For every 100 females, there were 99.8 males.  For every 100 females age 18 and over, there were 96.3 males.

The median income for a household in the city was $60,310, and the median income for a family was $66,365. Males had a median income of $36,227 versus $34,147 for females. The per capita income for the city was $22,900.  About 5.2% of families and 9.1% of the population were below the poverty line, including 8.4% of those under age 18 and 6.3% of those age 65 or over.

Culture 

The Cow Palace arena grounds straddle the border with San Francisco and is the home for the annual Grand National Rodeo, Horse & Stock Show. It has hosted diverse events such as concerts by the Beatles, the now-Golden State Warriors and their early appearances in the NBA Finals, the NHL San Jose Sharks hockey team, two short-lived minor league hockey teams (the IHL San Francisco Spiders and ECHL San Francisco Bulls), and two Republican National Conventions (in 1956 and 1964).

Century 20 Daly City is a modern megaplex movie theatre opened in 2002 as part of the Pacific Plaza business and retail development.

Several golf courses are located within or straddle the border with San Francisco. The Olympic Club has hosted the USGA U.S. Open five times, most recently in 2012, and will host both the 2028 PGA Championship and the 2032 Ryder Cup. The private San Francisco Golf Club and Lake Merced Golf Club have part or all of their course in Daly City. The Golden Gate National Recreation Area includes the city's Thornton Beach. The topography of this area (due to the San Andreas fault) is conducive to paragliding and hang gliding.

Daly City and neighboring Colma have emerged as shopping meccas for San Francisco residents. A combination of plentiful free parking space (compared to the constrained and expensive parking options in San Francisco) and San Mateo County's historically slightly lower state sales tax rate have contributed to this trend. Many big box retailers that are unable to operate in San Francisco due to real estate prices, space restrictions, or political / community opposition have opened stores in the Serramonte and Westlake neighborhoods. Daly City's shopping centers are Serramonte Center and Westlake Shopping Center.

Government 

The city council of Daly City is a five-member body composed of Mayor Dr. Rod Daus-Magbual, Vice Mayor Raymond A. Buenaventura, and Council members Pamela DiGiovanni, Juslyn C. Manalo, and Glenn R. Sylvester.

According to the California Secretary of State, as of February 10, 2019, Daly City has 46,684 registered voters. Of those, 24,175 (51.8%) are registered Democrats, 4,479 (9.6%) are registered Republicans, and 16,487 (35.3%) have declined to state a political party.

Education 

There are several public school districts in Daly City. The largest are the Jefferson Elementary School District and Jefferson Union High School District, both of which are headquartered in the city. In addition, there is the Bayshore Elementary School District (two schools), Brisbane School District (Panorama School in Daly City), and South San Francisco Unified School District (two schools in Daly City). Daly City has two high schools: Westmoor High School and Jefferson High School, plus a continuation school, Thornton High School and an adult school, Jefferson Adult Education. Daly City is also home to two Catholic parochial schools: Our Lady of Perpetual Help on Top-of-the-Hill and Our Lady of Mercy in Westlake. The city has four Peninsula Library System branches.

Transportation 

Daly City's highway infrastructure includes State Routes 1, 35, and 82, and Interstate 280. Interstate 280, which bisects Daly City, is a primary transportation corridor linking San Francisco with San Mateo and Santa Clara counties.

Daly City is a major hub for public transit. Bay Area Rapid Transit (BART) serves Daly City at a namesake station as well as at Colma Station, which abuts the Daly City limits). In the 1980s planning was conducted for the BART extension south from San Francisco, the first step being the Daly City Tailtrack Project, upon which turnaround project the San Francisco Airport Extension would later build. Daly City station is the terminus of BART's Blue and Green lines, and the furthermost point in the BART network where every destination in the system can be reached without a transfer during normal hours.

In addition to BART, Daly City station serves as the northern terminus of samTrans' ECR route and southern terminus of Muni's 14 Mission Rapid.

Since 2016, the San Francisco Municipal Transportation Agency has expressed interest in extending the Muni Metro to Daly City by extending the M Ocean View line, presently terminating at Balboa Park station.

Sister city
  Quezon City, Philippines, since October 1994

Notable people
 John Madden, NFL player, Hall of Fame coach and sportscaster, graduated from Jefferson High School in 1954
 Dave Pelzer, author of several books, including the memoir A Child Called "It"
 John Robinson, national championship-winning coach at USC and for the Los Angeles Rams 
 Sam Rockwell, Academy Award-winning actor, born at Seton Medical Center on November 5, 1968

See also 
 
 List of U.S. communities with Asian-American majority populations

References

Further reading

External links 

 

 
1911 establishments in California
Cities in San Mateo County, California
Cities in the San Francisco Bay Area
Filipino-American culture in California
Incorporated cities and towns in California
Populated coastal places in California